The List of shipwrecks in 1749 includes some ships sunk, wrecked or otherwise lost during 1749.

April
1749 did not begin on 1 January!

14 April

Unknown date

May

4 May

14 May

Unknown date

June

Unknown date

July

25 July

Unknown date

August

13 August

Unknown date

September

19 September

Unknown date

October

8 October

15 October

18 October

31 October

Unknown date

November

2 November

Unknown date

December

1 December

9 December

13 December

18 December

29 December

Unknown date

January

19 January

26 January

Unknown date

February

11 February

21 February

Unknown date

March

Unknown date

Unknown date

Notes
 Until 1752, the year began on Lady Day (25 March) Thus 24 March 1748 was followed by 25 March 1749. 31 December 1749 was followed by 1 January 1749.
 Issue is misdated 1749.

References

1749